VSpeech is a software that allows users to control computer using their voice. It's built based on Microsoft Speech technology and is released under GPL license.

Features

 Supports menu commands, program commands, system commands
 Integrated with Internet Explorer, Microsoft Office
 Allows custom dictionaries
 English dictation
 Vietnamese dictation (not finished)

See also

BK02 Software Development Group
VSpeech SDK Vietnamese Speech Recognition Library for developers

External links

Official page
Sourceforge.net page
Article on Tuoi Tre newspaper
Article on Thanh Nien newspaper

Vietnamese software